The Soviet Union (USSR) occupied most of the territory of the Baltic states in its 1944 Baltic Offensive during  World War II. The Red Army regained control over the three Baltic capitals and encircled retreating Wehrmacht and Latvian forces in the Courland Pocket where they held out until the final German surrender at the end of the war. 

The German forces were deported and the leaders of Latvian collaborating forces were executed as traitors. After the war, the Baltic territories were reorganized into constituent republics of the USSR until they declared independence in 1990 amid the dissolution of the Soviet Union in 1991.

Soviet offensives and reoccupation 

By 2 February 1944 the siege of Leningrad was over and the Soviet troops were on the border with Estonia. Having failed to break through, the Soviets launched the Tartu Offensive on 10 August, and the Baltic Offensive on 14 September with forces totalling 1.5 million. The High Command of the German Army issued Operation Aster on 16 September, whereby the Estonian forces would cover the German withdrawal. 

Soon after the Soviet reoccupation of the Estonian capital Tallinn, the first mission of the NKVD was to stop anyone escaping from the country. However, many refugees escaped to Sweden or Finland, particularly the Estonian Swedes, who had lived in coastal Estonia since the days of Danish and Swedish Estonia. 

The NKVD also targeted members of the National Committee of the Republic of Estonia. The Estonian Forest Brothers (established in 1941) initially maintained a low profile during the Soviet reoccupation. The 1945 VE Day did not bring a restoration of independence to Estonia, and the Forest Brothers then renewed their campaign of killing Soviet senior armed forces and NKVD officers.

In Latvia, NKVD units were the main anti-partisan force fighting against 10,000 active members of the resistance forces. The Soviets signed separate ceasefire agreements with the different resistance forces, which did not become active until after the end of the war; the agreement in Lithuania differed from those in Estonia and Latvia. The Soviets introduced conscription immediately after their occupation of Vilnius in July 1944. Only 14 percent of those eligible responded to the summons. The Soviets tracked down draft evaders and killed over 400 people. During 1944 and 1945 the Soviets conscripted 82,000 Lithuanians.

Attempts to restore independence 

There were efforts to restore independence during the German occupation. In 1941, the Lithuanians had overthrown Soviet rule two days before the Germans arrived in Kaunas. The Germans allowed the Provisional Government to function for over a month. Towards the end of the war, once it became clear that Germany would be defeated, many Lithuanians, Latvians and Estonians joined the Germans once again.

It was hoped that by engaging in such a war the Baltic countries would be able to attract Western support for the cause of independence from the USSR. In Latvia an underground nationalist Latvian Central Council was formed on 13 August 1943. An analogous body, the Supreme Committee for the Liberation of Lithuania, emerged on 25 November 1943.

On 23 March 1944, the underground National Committee of the Estonian Republic was founded. Thousands of Estonians not willing to side with the Nazis joined the Finnish Defence Forces to fight against the Soviet Union. The Finnish Infantry Regiment 200 was formed out of the volunteers known colloquially as the "Finnish Boys" (Estonian: soomepoisid). On 2 February 1944, the front reached the former Estonian border, starting the battle of Narva. The city was evacuated.

Jüri Uluots, the last legitimate prime minister and the head of the National Committee of the Republic of Estonia delivered a radio address that implored all able-bodied men born from 1904 through 1923 to report for military service. Prior to this, Uluots had opposed the mobilisation. The call drew support from across the country: 38,000 conscripts jammed registration centers. Two thousand Finland Boys returned.

In 1943 and 1944, two divisions of Waffen SS were formed from Latvians, predominantly conscripts, to fight against the Red Army. The battles of Narva were perceived by Estonian people as the fight for their country, a consolation for the humiliation of 1940. The lengthy German defense on the North Eastern border prevented a swift Soviet breakthrough into Estonia, which gave the underground Estonian National Committee enough time for an attempt to re-establish Estonian independence.

On 1 August 1944, the Estonian National Committee pronounced itself Estonia’s highest authority, and on 18 September 1944, acting Head of State Jüri Uluots appointed a new government led by Otto Tief. Over the radio, in English, the Estonian government declared its neutrality in the war. The government issued two editions of the State Gazette. On 21 September, nationalist forces seized the government buildings in Tallinn and ordered the German forces to leave. 

The Estonian flag was raised to the permanent flag mast on the tallest tower of Tallinn only to be removed by the Soviets four days later. The Estonian Government in Exile served to carry the continuity of the Estonian state forward until 1992, when Heinrich Mark, the last prime minister in the role of Head of State, handed his credentials over to the incoming President Lennart Meri. Latvian and Lithuanian governments-in-exile continued, based in their pre-war embassies in the U.S. and UK.

Allied powers and the Baltic states

Western Allies' lack of interest 

The Baltic states did not have governments in exile as effective as those of the French under Charles de Gaulle or the Polish under Władysław Sikorski, and their geographic location made communication to the West of circumstances there difficult. The leaders of Great Britain and the United States had little interest in the Baltic cause, particularly while the war against Nazi Germany remained undecided and secretly regarded them as disposable in order to secure Stalin's cooperation. Members of the European Left tended to support the official Soviet view on the Baltic states, regarding them as "naturally" belonging to the Soviet Union to safeguard its "legitimate" security interests.

The Germans' defeat in 1945 left Eastern Europe within the Soviet sphere of influence. However, despite territorial losses and a heavy reparations burden in the Continuation War, Finland survived as a neutral, western-oriented capitalist democracy and did not share the fate of the Baltic states. Despite this apparent freedom, the Finns still had to take into consideration Soviet foreign policy interests including specific accommodations in their domestic affairs, with critics calling the process "Finlandisation".

Western Allies acquiesce on Stalin's hold of the Baltics 
The precedent under international law established by the earlier-adopted Stimson Doctrine, as applied to the Baltic states in the Welles Declaration, issued on July 23, 1940 by US Under Secretary of State Sumner Welles, then acting Secretary of State, and the only public statement of policy by the US, defined the basis for non-recognition by the United States of the Soviet Union's forcible incorporation of the Baltic states.

Despite Welles's statement, the Baltic states soon reprised their centuries-long role as pawns in the conflicts of larger powers. After visiting Moscow in the winter of 1941–1942, British Foreign Minister Eden had already advocated sacrificing the Baltic states to secure Soviet cooperation in the war. The British ambassador to the U.S., Halifax, reported, "Mr. Eden cannot incur the danger of antagonizing Stalin, and the British War Cabinet have... agree[d] to negotiate a treaty with Stalin, which will recognize the 1940 frontiers of the Soviet Union." 

In March, 1942, Churchill wrote to Roosevelt urging the sacrifice of the Baltic states: "The increasing gravity of the war has led me to feel that the principles of the Atlantic Charter ought not to be construed so as to deny Russia the frontiers she occupied when Germany attacked here. ... I hope therefore that you will be able to give us a free hand to sign the treaty which Stalin desires as soon as possible."

By 1943 Roosevelt had also consigned the Baltic states and Eastern Europe to Stalin. Meeting with his confidante, Archbishop (later, Cardinal) Spellman in New York on September 3, Roosevelt stated, "The European people will simply have to endure Russian domination, in the hope that in ten or twenty years they will be able to live well with the Russians." Meeting with Stalin in Tehran on 1 December 1943, Roosevelt "said that he fully realized the three Baltic Republics had in history and again more recently been part of Russia and jokingly added, that when the Soviet armies re-occupied these areas, he did not intend to go to war with the Soviet Union on this point." A month later, Roosevelt related to Otto von Habsburg that he had told the Russians they could take over and control Romania, Bulgaria, Bukovina, Eastern Poland, Lithuania, Estonia, Latvia, and Finland.

The future was sealed when on 9 October 1944, Churchill met with Stalin in Moscow and penciled out the post-war partition of Europe. Churchill recounts: "At length I said, 'Might it not be thought rather cynical if it seemed that we had disposed of these issues, so fateful to millions of people, in such an offhand manner? Let us burn the paper.' — 'No, you keep it,' said Stalin." The February 1945 Yalta Conference, widely regarded as determining the future of Europe, invoked the Atlantic Charter and the right of all peoples to choose the form of government under which they will live; however, it did not directly address the issue of the Baltic states, paving the path to unopposed Soviet hegemony over post-war Eastern Europe.

The attitude taken by the Western Allies with regard to the Baltic states following World War II was summarized by Hector McNeil, the Under-Secretary of the Foreign Affairs (1945-1946), before the House of Commons on 10 February 1947. McNeil stated that the British government recognized the absorption of the Baltic States into the Soviet Union de facto but not de jure. He also agreed that the annexation violated the self-determination principle of the Atlantic Charter, but that it should be kept in mind that the Baltic states had been part of the Russian Empire before 1918.

See also
 Soviet re-occupation of Latvia in 1944

References

Citations

Bibliography

Occupation of the Baltic states
Military history of Estonia
Military history of Latvia
Military history of Lithuania
Military history of the Soviet Union
Soviet military occupations
1944 in Estonia
1944 in Latvia
1944 in Lithuania
1944 in the Soviet Union
1944 in military history